Nebria pharina is a species of ground beetle in the Nebriinae subfamily that is endemic to Tibet.

References

pharina
Beetles described in 1929
Beetles of Asia
Endemic fauna of Tibet